Eric Joseph Holcomb (born May 2, 1968) is an American politician who is the 51st and current governor of Indiana, serving since 2017. A member of the Republican Party, he served as the 51st lieutenant governor of Indiana from 2016 to 2017 under Governor Mike Pence, who left the governorship in 2017 to become the vice president of the United States. Holcomb was nominated to fill the remainder of Lieutenant Governor Sue Ellspermann's term after she resigned on March 2, 2016, to become president of Ivy Tech Community College. He won the 2016 election for governor of Indiana over Democratic nominee John R. Gregg. Holcomb was reelected in 2020 over Democratic nominee Woody Myers and Libertarian nominee Donald Rainwater.

Early life and education
Holcomb was born in Indianapolis, Indiana. He graduated from Pike High School in Indianapolis, and in 1990 from Hanover College in Hanover, Indiana. At Hanover, he joined the fraternity Phi Gamma Delta and served as chapter president. Holcomb served in the United States Navy for six years as an intelligence officer, stationed in Jacksonville, Florida, and in Lisbon, Portugal. He received an Honorary Doctor of Humane Letters Degree from Trine University on October 5, 2018, and an Honorary Doctorate of Laws from Anderson University on May 11, 2019.

Early political career
Holcomb began working for John Hostettler, a member of the United States House of Representatives, in 1997. In 2000, Holcomb ran for the Indiana House of Representatives against John Frenz, but was defeated.

From 2003 to 2011, Holcomb served as an advisor to Indiana Governor Mitch Daniels, eventually rising to the role of Deputy Chief of Staff, and served as campaign manager for Daniels's 2008 gubernatorial campaign. He became Chairman of the Indiana Republican Party in 2011. In 2013, he resigned to become the state chief of staff to U.S. Senator Dan Coats. In March 2015 Coats announced that he would not run for reelection to the Senate in the 2016 election, and Holcomb announced his intention to run. In February 2016, Holcomb withdrew from the Senate race.

Lieutenant governor of Indiana
After Lieutenant Governor Sue Ellspermann announced her resignation, Governor Mike Pence chose Holcomb to succeed her and to be his running mate in the 2016 gubernatorial election. Holcomb was sworn in as lieutenant governor on March 3, 2016.

Governor of Indiana

Elections

2016 

Governor Mike Pence was running for reelection with Holcomb as his running mate in the spring and summer of 2016. By late June, rumors that Pence would be the Republican Party's nominee for vice president under presumptive presidential nominee Donald Trump began to gain traction. In early July, Trump officially selected Pence as his running mate. Pence then withdrew from Indiana's gubernatorial election and Holcomb withdrew as the nominee for lieutenant governor. Holcomb decided to pursue the nomination for governor and was selected on the second ballot by the Indiana State Republican Central Committee, defeating Rep. Susan Brooks, Rep. Todd Rokita, and State Senator Jim Tomes.

Holcomb chose Indiana State Auditor Suzanne Crouch as his running mate. They faced 2012 Democratic nominee and former Indiana House Speaker John R. Gregg and his running mate, State Representative Christina Hale. After an unprecedented 106-day campaign, Holcomb defeated Gregg, 51.4% to 45.4%. He ran slightly behind the Trump-Pence ticket, which carried Indiana with 56 percent of the vote.

2020 

Holcomb was reelected governor in 2020, defeating former state health commissioner Woody Myers with 57% of the vote. He received the most votes for governor in Indiana history.

First term
After winning the election, Holcomb announced his agenda for the upcoming Indiana General Assembly legislative session. What Holcomb calls his “Next Level Agenda” is based on five “pillars”: strengthening and diversifying Indiana's economy, strengthening Indiana's infrastructure, strengthening education and workforce training, strengthening public health and attacking addiction and providing great government service at an exceptional value to taxpayers. He has said that civility is the foundation on which the other pillars are based.

Holcomb's first act as governor was creating the office of drug prevention, treatment and enforcement and tasking that office with tackling the opioid crisis and other addiction issues in Indiana. Additionally, early in his first term, Holcomb pardoned Keith Cooper, who served eight years in prison after being wrongfully convicted of an armed robbery; declared a disaster emergency at the East Chicago Superfund Site; and ended contract discussions between the Indiana Finance Authority and Agile Networks to manage Indiana's communications infrastructure, including cell towers.

Holcomb has made attracting international investment and opening more overseas markets for Hoosier-produced goods a priority. Since taking office, he has led 11 international economic development trips visiting with government, business, education, military and nonprofit leaders in the United Kingdom (as governor-elect), France, Hungary, Japan, India, Canada, Israel, Czech Republic, Slovakia, Austria, Switzerland, Germany, Italy, Belgium, Luxembourg, South Korea and China. He has also visited Hoosier servicemen and women and members of the United States Diplomatic Corps serving overseas.

Holcomb's international engagement strategy has resulted in foreign direct investment (FDI) into Indiana increasing 300% since 2017. In recognition of his efforts, the Indianapolis-based International Center named Holcomb its 2018 International Citizen of the Year.

In April 2017, the Indiana legislature approved Holcomb's request for higher fuel taxes and BMV registration fees to fund infrastructure spending, primarily on road maintenance and construction. The law went into effect on July 1, 2017, and is projected to raise on average $1.2 billion per year through 2024.

In the first quarter of 2019, the National Journal reported that Holcomb's reelection faced serious challenges. It ranked him number 10 on its endangered list, writing, "Holcomb is facing potential match-ups with former state health commissioner Woody Myers and state Senator Eddie Melton." By the end of the second quarter, his approval rating had risen to 50%.

In November 2019, the Center for Investigative Reporting reported that Holcomb had personally pressured an Indiana OSHA investigator to drop a worker fatality case against Amazon so that Indianapolis could have a better chance at being the home of Amazon's HQ2 (a major new office). His office denied the allegations, saying that he had not attended the meeting with the OSHA commissioner and investigator. Holcomb also said the accusations against him would pose a threat to Indiana's "positive business climate" and demanded they be retracted. Regardless of whether Holcomb was directly involved, OSHA eventually dropped the citations against Amazon's fulfillment center and the case was reclassified as one of "employee misconduct" rather than a shortfall in training and safety procedures.

In July 2020, Attorney General Curtis Hill accused Holcomb of overstepping his authority by issuing a statewide face mask mandate with criminal penalties. Hill said that only the legislature has the power under the Indiana constitution to create laws.  Holcomb vetoed the laws passed in the special session, and the legislature overrode his vetoes. But on June 2, 2022, the Indiana Supreme Court sided with Holcomb. Citing the state constitution, the court found it was the legislature, not Holcomb, that had overstepped its authority. Chief Justice Loretta Rush wrote in the unanimous opinion, "Simply put, absent a constitutional amendment ... the General Assembly cannot do what HEA-1123 permits, ... our Constitution authorizes only the Governor to call a special session, the General Assembly can set additional sessions—but only by fixing their length and frequency in a law passed during a legislative session and presented to the Governor."

Second term
Holcomb was inaugurated to a second term on January 11, 2021.

In March 2022, Holcomb vetoed H.E.A. 1041, a bill passed by the Indiana General Assembly that would prohibit transgender women from participating in state-sanctioned girls' sports. He cited the bill's low probability of surviving judicial scrutiny and the lack of pressing concern as his reasons for vetoing it. On May 24 the General Assembly overrode Holcomb's veto, passing the bill into law.

In August 2022, Holcomb led a trade delegation to Taiwan in an effort to strengthen economic ties between Taiwan and Indiana. The delegation also visited South Korea. The visit came following several high profile visits by U.S. officials to Taiwan, leading to increased tension between the United States and the People's Republic of China.

Personal life 
Holcomb's wife, Janet, runs a family business in Madison County, Indiana. They have no children, and own a miniature schnauzer, Henry Holcomb, who is known as the "First Dog of Indiana".

In December 2022, Holcomb was hospitalized with a sudden case of pneumonia.

Electoral history

References

External links

Governor of Indiana official government site

|-

|-

|-

|-

|-

|-

1968 births
Living people
2012 United States presidential electors
21st-century American politicians
Republican Party governors of Indiana
Hanover College alumni
Lieutenant Governors of Indiana
Members of the Church of God (Anderson, Indiana)
Political chiefs of staff
State political party chairs of Indiana
United States congressional aides
United States Navy officers